The Fire in the Stone is a 1984 Australian TV film about teenagers in the town of Coober Pedy. It is based on the 1973 novel of the same name by Colin Thiele.

Plot

When his precious cache of opals is stolen, 14-year-old Ernie, who lives with his alcoholic father in the harsh and lawless opal fields of inland Australia, sets out with a friend determined to find the thief.

Cast

Reception

References

External links

Fire in the Stone at Oz movies

1984 films
1984 television films
Australian drama television films
Films based on Australian novels
Films set in South Australia
Films shot in Australia
1980s English-language films
1980s Australian films